Brijesh or Brijesh (Brijesh) is an Indian given name. It is an epithet of the Hindu god Krishna and its literal meaning is "king of Braj", a region in northern India that is associated with the childhood of Krishna.

Notable persons with this name

Brijesh
 Brijesh Damani (born 1982), professional snooker player
 Brijesh Dhar Jayal (born 1935), Indian Air Force officer
 Brijesh Kumar Gupta, Nepalese politician
 Brijesh Lawrence (born 1989), Saint Kitts and Nevis sprinter 
 Brijesh Patel (born 1952), cricketer
 Brijesh Shandilya, playback singer from Uttar Pradesh
 Brijesh Singh, BJP politician from Uttar Pradesh

Brajesh
 Brajesh Mishra (1928–2012), diplomat and politician
 Brajesh Pathak (born 1962), politician and minister in the government of Uttar Pradesh
 Brajesh Katheriya, politician from the Samajwadi Party of Uttar Pradesh
 Brajesh Singh (died 1966), politician from the Communist Party
 

Indian given names
Titles and names of Krishna